Peter Bourke (28 June 1883 – 18 March 1951) was an Australian rules footballer who played with South Melbourne in the Victorian Football League (VFL).

Notes

External links 

1883 births
1951 deaths
Australian rules footballers from Victoria (Australia)
Sydney Swans players
South Ballarat Football Club players
Australian military personnel of World War I